Common Threads may refer to:

 A long-time radio show broadcast on station WKMK (WHTG-FM)
 An organization, supported by Gail Simmons, that teaches low-income children to cook wholesome, affordable meals
 Common Threads: Stories from the Quilt, a documentary film about the NAMES Project AIDS Memorial Quilt
 Common Threads (album)